Castle Strike is a 2003 video game developed by Related Designs.

Gameplay 
Castle Strike takes place during medieval times. There is a campaign, skirmish and multiplayer option, the multiplayer is hosted by Gamespy. There are three playable nations in the game, those being England, France and Germany.

Reception

References 	

2004 video games
Strategy video games
Windows games
Windows-only games
Video games developed in Germany
Video games set in castles
Video games set in Europe
Video games set in the Middle Ages